Wall is a surname.

List
People with the surname include:
Alfred Wall (composer) (1875–1936), British violinist and composer
Alfred M. Wall (1889–1957), British trade unionist and political activist
Anita Wall (born 1940), Swedish actress
Annie Russell Wall (1859-1942), American author
Anthony Wall (born 1975), English golfer
Anthony Wall (film-maker) (active 1980–2008), English documentary film maker
Anthony Wall (RAF officer) (1888–1989), British pilot
Art Wall Jr. (1923–2011), American golfer
Barbara Wall (born 1948), Australian squash player
Brad Wall (born 1965), Canadian politician
Carol Wall (born circa 1953), Canadian politician
C. T. C. Wall (born 1946), British mathematician
Daniel E. Wall (active since 1995), American civil servant
Derek Wall (active since 1979), British politician
Donald Dines Wall (1921–2000), American mathematician
Donne Wall (born 1967), American baseballer
Drury Wall (1874–?) American politician
Ella Lillian Wall Van Leer, Women’s rights activist and artist
Erin Wall (1975–2020), Canadian operatic soprano
Frank Wall (herpetologist) (1868–1960), Sri Lankan and Indian physician and herpetologist
Frank Wall (American politician) (1908–1998), American politician
Frank Wall (Australian politician) (1879–1941), Australian politician
Frank Wall (politician) (active 1981–1991), Irish politician
Frank Wall (steamboat engineer) (1810–1896), American engineer
Garret D. Wall (1783–1850), American military officer and politician
George Wall (1885–1962), English footballer
George Wall (botanist) (1821–1894), Sri Lankan merchant, politician and scientist
Gerard Wall (1920–1992), Kiwi (New Zealand) politician
Jack Wall (disambiguation), several people
James Charles Wall (1860–1943), British historian
James S. Wall (born 1964), American religious leader
James Walter Wall (1820–1872), American politician
Jamie Wall (born 1977), British auto racing driver
Jeannie Wall (born 1969), American ski mountaineer
Jeff Wall (born 1946), Canadian artist
Jeff Wall (lawyer) (born 1946), American attorney and politician
John Wall (disambiguation), several people
Joseph Wall (disambiguation), several people
Kim Wall, British actor
Larry Wall (born 1949), American programmer
Lucille Wall (1898–1986), American actress
Lyndsay Wall (born 1985), American ice hockey player
Martin Dingle-Wall (born 1971), Australian actor
Max Wall (1908–1990), English actor
Melanie Wall (born 1971), American psychiatric biostatistician
Mervyn Wall (1908–1997), Irish writer
Pat Wall (1933–1990), English politician
Patrick Wall (1916–1998), British military and politician
Paul Wall (born 1981), American rapper
Ricardo Wall (1694–1777), Irish-Spanish politician
Richard Wall (21st century), Irish actor
Richard Eric Wall (born 1949), Cincinnati, Ohio-born, musician, promotor, entrepreneur
Robert Wall (disambiguation), several people
Shannon J. Wall (1919–2007), American seaman and labour leader
Sir Stephen Wall (born 1947), British diplomat
Steve Wall (fl. 1980's -), Irish actor and musician
Thomas Wall (active 1781), American theatre administrator
Thomas Wall (politician) (1840 – after 1883), American politician
Tim Wall (1904–1981), American cricketer
Travis Wall (born 1987), American dancer
William Wall (disambiguation), several people

See also
Wahl (surname)
Walls (surname)
Walle (name)
Wall (disambiguation)
Wal (disambiguation)

English-language surnames
German-language surnames
Russian Mennonite surnames